Diaditus tejanus is a species of assassin bug in the family Reduviidae. It is found in Central America and North America.

References

Further reading

 

Reduviidae
Articles created by Qbugbot
Insects described in 1980
Hemiptera of North America